Fujitaro Kubota (1879–1973) was a Japanese-born American gardener and philanthropist.

Kubota was among the Issei emigrants from Japan who made new lives for themselves in the United States. When he first arrived, he worked on the railroad. By 1922, he was able to start his own gardening business in Seattle. In 1927, he began work on a small garden as a hobby; and the task would assume an important role in the rest of his life and that of his children and grandchildren.

Kubota and his family were interned at Camp Minidoka in Idaho during World War II, following the signing of Executive Order 9066. His Seattle-born son Tom (1917–2004) would meet his wife at Minidoka.

Honors 

In the year before his death, the Japanese government honored this lifelong gardener by presenting him with the Order of the Sacred Treasure with Gold and Silver Rays "for his achievements in his adopted country, for introducing and building respect for Japanese Gardening."  The formal decoration badge is a Maltese cross in gilt and silver which was produced by the Japan Mint.

The public garden which bears Kubota's name is no less significant as a monument to Kubota's life.

See also
 Kubota Garden, Rainier Beach neighborhood in south Seattle
 Bloedel Reserve, Bainbridge Island

Notes

References
 Itō, Kazuo. (1973).  Issei: A History of Japanese Immigrants in North America. Seattle: Japanese Community Service. 
 Joyce, Alice. (2006).  Gardenwalks in the Pacific Northwest: Beautiful Gardens Along the Coast from Oregon to British Columbia. Guilford, Connecticut: Globe Pequot. ;

External links
 Kubota Garden Foundation; .

1879 births
1973 deaths
Japanese emigrants to the United States
Japanese-American internees
20th-century American philanthropists
American gardeners
American landscape and garden designers
Recipients of the Order of the Sacred Treasure